Wacław Kowalski (2 May 1916 – 27 October 1990) was a Polish actor. He appeared in more than eighty films from 1947 to 1983.

Selected filmography

References

External links 

1916 births
1990 deaths
Polish male film actors
Polish male stage actors
People from Gzhatsky Uyezd
Recipients of the Order of Polonia Restituta